"I Miss You Already (And You're Not Even Gone)" is a song recorded by American country music artist Faron Young. It was released in February 1957 as a single only. The song reached No. 5 on the Billboard Hot Country Singles & Tracks chart.

Chart performance

Billy Joe Royal version

The song was recorded by American country music artist Billy Joe Royal, under the title "I Miss You Already".  It was released in August 1986 as the third single from the album Looking Ahead. The song reached No. 14 on the Billboard Hot Country Singles & Tracks chart.

Chart performance

Other versions
Margie Rayburn released a version of the song as a single in 1960 under the title "I Miss You Already", but it did not chart.

References

	

1956 songs
1956 singles
1960 singles
1986 singles
Faron Young songs
Billy Joe Royal songs
Margie Rayburn songs
Songs written by Marvin Rainwater
Capitol Records singles
Atlantic Records singles
Liberty Records singles